Crypt of the NecroDancer is a roguelike rhythm video game developed and published by Canadian independent game studio Brace Yourself Games. The game takes fundamental elements of a roguelike dungeon exploration game and adds a beat-matching rhythm game set to an original soundtrack written by Danny Baranowsky. The player's actions are most effective when moving the character set to the beat of the current song and are impaired when they miss a beat, so it is necessary to learn the rhythmic patterns that the various creatures follow. The mixed-genre game includes the ability to import custom music, and the option to use a dance pad instead of traditional controllers or the keyboard. The game was released for Linux, OS X, and Windows in April 2015, being co-published by Klei Entertainment, for the PlayStation 4 and Vita in February 2016, for the Xbox One in February 2017, and for Nintendo Switch in February 2018. Crypt of the NecroDancer Pocket Edition, developed for iOS, was released in June 2016.

A crossover title, Cadence of Hyrule, featuring music and elements from The Legend of Zelda, was released in June 2019 for the Nintendo Switch. A followup game, Rift of the NecroDancer, was announced in August 2022.

Gameplay 
Crypt of the NecroDancer is a top-down 2D roguelike rhythm game in which the player controls one of a selection of characters to explore several levels of an underground dungeon that are procedurally generated, similar to roguelike games.

Players can manipulate their character by using either a dance pad, a keyboard, or a gamepad. Unlike traditional roguelikes, the player can only have their character move or attack if they perform the action on the beat of the music. Enemies drop coins when killed, and killing successive enemies without taking damage or missing a beat increases a coin-scoring multiplier. Failure to match the beat does not directly harm the character in most situations, but does reset the scoring multiplier and may cause the character to be harmed by a nearby monster if they are in their attack path. The character can also be harmed by moving into a monster's path. When the character's health meter empties, the game is over. Monsters move according to predetermined patterns that the player must learn to attack and avoid damage; skeletons, for example, target the player directly, but only move and attack on every other beat.

As the player explores, they will collect new weapons, armor, usable items, and treasure; the player's inventory is automatically managed by the game. Defeating monsters yields several coins that can be used to purchase items from shops within the dungeon. Some diamonds are used for purchasing permanent enhancements to the character's abilities in the game's lobby. The dungeon is divided into four zones of four levels each. The first three levels of each zone require the player to find the exit and defeat a mini-boss to unlock it; the fourth level is a larger boss character that must be defeated to progress further. Also, the player is limited to the length of the song to complete the level; when the song ends, they are automatically sent to the next level through a trapdoor, possibly landing them close to powerful enemies.

The player returns to the game's lobby area after dying or optionally at any time, losing any items, gold, or other equipment, though retaining any diamonds they have found. The lobby features shops where the player can spend those diamonds for permanent upgrades before restarting the game or, if they have completed any zones, accessing the next available zone. The player can also access other game modes, such as "All Zones Mode"  in which the player must make their way through the entire crypt without dying. The player initially has access to the main character, Cadence, but new characters with different modes of play also become available as the player completes certain goals: for example, the monk character receives one free item in each shop but immediately dies if he touches gold. Special trainers and other beneficial non-player characters can be rescued from certain zones, and once rescued, will provide services to the player from the main lobby, such as letting the player train against enemies and bosses, or providing items that the player can buy with diamonds and use on their next journey into the crypt.

The songs in the game's soundtracks are ordered in ascending tempo across zones and levels, making deeper levels more challenging than earlier ones. The user additionally has the ability to set custom music for each of the game's levels.

Plot 
In the main game, the player controls Cadence, the daughter of a famed treasure hunter who has gone missing. In searching for him, she falls into a crypt controlled by the NecroDancer, who steals Cadence's heart and forces her to challenge his minions to retrieve it. She is forced to fight through the crypt's dungeon with her actions tied to the beat of the music and her heart, so as to stay alive and defeat the NecroDancer.

Near the heart of the crypt, Cadence finds one of the NecroDancer's minions named "Dead Ringer". She defeats him, revealing that it was her missing father and frees him from the NecroDancer's control, allowing him to help her defeat the NecroDancer. They take the NecroDancer's magical golden Lute and use it to kill him, and then use its power to resurrect Cadence's dead mother, Melody. However, they discover that the lute is cursed; Melody must keep playing it forever to sustain her life, but the lute will gradually consume her humanity just as it did to the NecroDancer. Melody enters the crypt in search of answers and a way to break the curse of the lute.

When Melody reaches the end of the crypt, she uses the Golden Lute to resurrect the NecroDancer and find answers, but he attacks and Melody defeats him. The NecroDancer tries to flee but is cast into a crevice by Aria (Melody's mother) who was lying in a coffin with a dagger in her chest and is brought back to life by the Lute. Aria reveals that she knows how to break the curse of the lute, but was betrayed by the NecroDancer and left for dead. Intending to finish what she started, she begins her ascent out of the crypt in search of a shrine that will destroy the lute once and for all.

When Aria reaches the shrine, she is attacked by the lute itself, which mutates into a large monster in an attempt to save itself from destruction. After defeating the lute's monster form, Aria sacrifices her life to destroy the cursed instrument, returning Melody to full life and allowing her to return to her family, who later bury Aria together.

Development 
Crypt of the NecroDancer was a creation of programmer Ryan Clark, inspired by thinking about the traditional structure of roguelike games. Clark found that the player-character's death in roguelikes often occurred due to conditions created by the procedural-generation of the game as opposed to player's skill, and wanted to make a game that was more "fair" to the player to escape or avoid seemingly difficult situations. Clark considered how games like Spelunky put the player more in control of their fate, as he viewed it as "a game that is really hard but you can still improve. If you die, you still know it was your fault" whereas in other games a player might die because "the game is simply unfair." However, Clark also found that removing the turn-based nature of roguelike in games like Spelunky or FTL: Faster Than Light lost some of the flavors of roguelikes, and sought a way to maintain the turn-based nature. He came up with the idea of using turns where each turn lasted only a short amount of real-time; as such the "lack of time to think renders impossible the careful study and patience of the expert NetHack player". With this concept, Clark recognized that this was similar to beat-matching rhythm games, and quickly refined the concept around the rhythm-based roguelike game. The title came after discovering this concept, and plays on the pun of the word "necromancer".

Initially, Clark programmed the game to require the player to be relatively accurate to the music's beat, similar to the accuracy used by rhythm games. He found this timing to be too tense, as the player was more likely to miss the short accuracy window while stressed and would lead to the character being harmed, creating more stress on the player. Instead, he greatly expanded the accuracy window, as well as programmed a simple autocalibration system that recognized if the player was ahead or behind the beat to some degree to match the player's current stress levels, both aimed to help make the game fairer and remove player frustration. Furthermore, he found that when he had the player move on the beat and monsters on the half-beat, the game played too close to a roguelike and instead had all characters move on the beat, with the player's action having priority, which while posed a few drawbacks he had to program around, felt much more natural to the game.

The Beat tracking algorithm used in the game is known as the Multi-feature Beat tracker. It is implemented in the Essentia framework and determines the positions of the beats to estimate the beats per minute, which is then used to set the tempo for the game.
The game was developed using the Monkey X programming language.

The game was released on Steam early access on July 30, 2014, using public feedback to improve the title, with full release on April 23, 2015. The game was released for the PlayStation 4 and PlayStation Vita on February 2, 2016. An iOS version, with support for both screen and Bluetooth controllers, was released on June 30, 2016.  An Xbox One version of the game was released on February 10, 2017. A Nintendo Switch version was released on February 1, 2018, which includes a new character exclusive to the platform as well as co-operative support. The developers had approached Nintendo about providing Switch-unique DLC based on Nintendo's properties for this release. Instead, this led to further discussions to make a wholly new crossover game, Cadence of Hyrule, with Cadence joined by Link and Zelda in the world of The Legend of Zelda.

The developers announced plans to release a downloadable content prequel expansion, Crypt of the NecroDancer: Amplified, to the game in September 2016. They 
introduced this expansion through Early Access on Steam starting on January 24, 2017, to get feedback during development. The expansion includes an additional zone, a new boss named Fortissimole, a new protagonist called Nocturna, new non-main characters named Diamond, Mary and Tempo, a new soundtrack by OverClocked ReMix, and new items for the game, including familiars for the protagonist.

A major update to Crypt of the NecroDancer was released in July 2022. Besides making the game more compatible with the Steam Deck, the updated included a "No Beat" mode that allows players to play any character without needing to follow the beat (like the character Bard), as well a greatly improved level editor.

In August 2022, the Synchrony DLC was announced. It includes new characters and items as well as co-op and competitive online multiplayer support for up to eight players. In addition, Brace Yourself Games teased a follow-up rhythm game, Rift of the NecroDancer.

Music 
The game's soundtrack was composed by Danny Baranowsky, designed to vary in speed and rhythmic complexity the farther the player gets within the game. Baranowsky's friend dubbed the new genre of music "Spookhouse Rock". The game has four additional soundtracks: an EDM soundtrack by Alex Esquivel ("A_Rival") from group Super Square, a heavy metal soundtrack by YouTube personality Jules Conroy, better known as "FamilyJules", a "freestyle retro" soundtrack by composer Jake Kaufman, also known as "virt", and a synthwave soundtrack by various artists from Girlfriend Records.

The Crypt of the Necrodancer: Amplified DLC added a fifth additional soundtrack by OverClocked ReMix.

The Xbox One version of the game added a sixth additional soundtrack by Chipzel.

A free update to the PC version of the game was released on August 22, 2017, adding a seventh additional soundtrack by Masafumi Takada, consisting of arrangements from the Danganronpa franchise. The update also added in the Chipzel soundtrack from the Xbox One release.

Reception 

Critical reception was positive. Destructoid named the game one of their favorite entries at PAX Prime 2013, and praised its execution. Joystiq also gave the game a positive review. Gaming Age described the game as "a wildly imaginative take on the formula".

Accolades

Cadence of Hyrule 

Nintendo and Brace Yourself Games announced a crossover title, Cadence of Hyrule - Crypt of the NecroDancer Featuring The Legend of Zelda, based on Crypts mechanics but taking place within the universe of The Legend of Zelda. The crossover was released exclusively for Nintendo Switch on June 13, 2019. In the game's main story mode, players play as either Link or Zelda, with Cadence and Aria becoming playable later in the game.

References

External links 
 

2015 video games
Fantasy video games
Early access video games
Indie video games
IOS games
Linux games
MacOS games
PlayStation 4 games
PlayStation Vita games
Nintendo Switch games
Roguelike video games
Music video games
Cooperative video games
Video games with Steam Workshop support
Video games developed in Canada
Video games featuring female protagonists
Video games scored by Danny Baranowsky
Video games using procedural generation
Windows games
Video games with downloadable content
Xbox One games
Game Developers Choice Award winners
Multiplayer and single-player video games